Şilki (pronounced ) or Šilki or Shilki, or possibly Jilki (posthumously Islamized as ˁAbdallāh; mid 9th - beginning of the 10th century) was a Volga Bulgarian ruler (iltäbär). According to the controversial History of Jaˁfar, Şilki was a descendant of Batbayan, the eldest son of Kubrat of "Old Great Bulgaria" (see genealogy below). This is possibly but not necessarily contradicted by the general assumption that Volga Bulgaria was established by another of Kubrat's sons, Kotrag. Şilki is credited with promoting the unification of the Bulgar tribes in the area, but the events of his reign are obscure or unverifiable. He is sometimes assumed to have initiated the conversion of the Volga Bulgars to Islam. His son Almış, the most famous Volga Bulgar ruler, was definitely a Muslim, and received a caliphal embassy led by Aḥmad ibn Faḍlān. Almış was given the new Muslim name Jaˁfar ibn ˁAbdallāh (i.e., Jaˁfar, son of ˁAbdallāh), which in turn has led to the belief that Şilki bore the Muslim name ˁAbdallāh. However, "son of ˁAbdallāh" was a traditional filiation given to new converts to Islam (like the Mamluks of Egypt), replacing the name of their non-Muslim fathers with the name of the father of the Prophet Muḥammad.

Genealogy
Kubrat
Batbayan
 Timer (Juraš) - only in History of Jaˁfar
 Sulabi - only in History of Jaˁfar
 Ayyar - only in History of Jaˁfar
 Tat Utyak - only in History of Jaˁfar
 Kan Qarajar - only in History of Jaˁfar
 Ugïr Aydar - only in History of Jaˁfar
Şilki

References
 
 Golden, P. B., An Introduction to the History of the Turkic Peoples, Wiesbaden, 1992.
 Golden, P. B., "Nomads of the western Eurasian steppes: Ogurs, Onogurs and Khazars, in: H. Roemer et al. (eds.), Philologiae Turcicae Fundamenta, III, Berlin, 2001: 282-302.
 Nurutdinov, F., et al. (eds.), Bahši Iman, Džagfar tarihy, vol. 1, Orenburg, 1993.

External links 
Text of the Cäğfär Taríxı

History of Tatarstan
Volga Bulgaria
10th-century rulers in Europe